Choisy-le-Roi station (French: Gare de Choisy-le-Roi) is a station in Paris' express suburban rail system, the RER. It is situated on the Paris–Bordeaux railway. It serves the commune of Choisy-le-Roi, in the Val-de-Marne department.

See also
List of stations of the Paris RER

External links

 

Railway stations in France opened in 1840
Réseau Express Régional stations
Railway stations in Val-de-Marne